Brebowbach is a creek in Mecklenburg-Vorpommern, Germany. It flows into the Peenestrom, which is connected with the Baltic Sea, near Zemitz.

See also
List of rivers of Mecklenburg-Vorpommern

Rivers of Mecklenburg-Western Pomerania
Rivers of Germany